Tomáš Knotek (born January 13, 1990) is a Czech professional ice hockey player. He played with HC Kladno in the Czech Extraliga during the 2010–11 Czech Extraliga season.

References

External links

1990 births
Czech ice hockey forwards
Rytíři Kladno players
Living people
Sportspeople from Kladno
Stadion Hradec Králové players
Czech expatriate ice hockey players in Canada
Czech expatriate ice hockey players in Germany
Czech expatriate sportspeople in France
Expatriate ice hockey players in France